Henri Sitek (11 July 1929 – 24 December 2011) was a Polish-French professional racing cyclist. He rode in the 1955 Tour de France.

References

External links
 

1929 births
2011 deaths
French male cyclists
Polish male cyclists
People from Wieluń County
Sportspeople from Łódź Voivodeship